Belgium participated in the Eurovision Song Contest 2012 with the song "Would You?" written by Nina Sampermans, Jean Bosco Safari and Walter Mannaerts. The song was performed by Iris, who was internally selected by the Flemish broadcaster Vlaamse Radio- en Televisieomroeporganisatie (VRT) in November 2011 to represent the nation at the 2012 contest in Baku, Azerbaijan. The song was selected through the national final Eurosong 2012: Een song voor Iris, which was organised by VRT and featured two songs. In the final on 17 March 2012, "Would You?" was selected as the winning song after gaining 53% of the public televote.

Belgium was drawn to compete in the first semi-final of the Eurovision Song Contest which took place on 22 May 2012. Performing during the show in position 8, "Would You?" was not announced among the top 10 entries of the first semi-final and therefore did not qualify to compete in the final. It was later revealed that Belgium placed seventeenth out of the 18 participating countries in the semi-final with 16 points.

Background

In 2011, Witloof Bay represented the country with the song "With Love Baby", placing eleventh in the second semi-final and failing to advance to the final.

The Belgian broadcaster for the 2012 contest, who broadcasts the event in Belgium and organises the selection process for its entry, was Vlaamse Radio- en Televisieomroeporganisatie (VRT). The Belgian participation in the contest alternates between two broadcasters: the Flemish VRT and the Walloon Radio Télévision Belge de la Communauté Française (RTBF). Both broadcasters have selected the Belgian entry using national finals and internal selections in the past. In 2010, VRT internally selected the Belgian entry, while in 2011, RTBF organised a national final in order to select the entry that would represent the nation. On 5 September 2011, VRT confirmed Belgium's participation in the 2012 Eurovision Song Contest, internally selecting the artist while holding the national final Eurosong to select the song.

Before Eurovision

Artist selection 
On 18 November 2011, VRT announced that they had internally selected Laura van den Bruel (Iris) to represent Belgium at the Eurovision Song Contest 2012. On 29 February 2012, the broadcaster revealed that the song Iris would perform at the contest would be selected through a two-song national selection.

Eurosong 2012: Een song voor Iris 
A submission period was opened on 19 December 2011 for songwriters to submit their songs until 16 January 2012. Two songs were selected for the national final from 270 received during the submission period and were announced on 16 March 2012. The final took place on 17 March 2012 at the Het Omroepcentrum in Brussels, hosted by Peter Van de Veire and was broadcast on Eén as well as online at the broadcaster's website een.be and the official Eurovision Song Contest website eurovision.tv. The two competing songs were both performed by Iris and the winning song, "Would You?", was selected solely by public televoting and announced later on the same day during the Eén talk show Vrienden Van de Veire. The national final was watched by 575,112 viewers in Belgium with a market share of 28.39%.

Promotion 
Iris specifically promoted "Would You?" as the Belgian Eurovision entry on 21 April 2012 by performing during the Eurovision in Concert event which was held at the Melkweg venue in Amsterdam, Netherlands and hosted by Ruth Jacott and Cornald Maas.

At Eurovision

According to Eurovision rules, all nations with the exceptions of the host country and the "Big Five" (France, Germany, Italy, Spain and the United Kingdom) are required to qualify from one of two semi-finals in order to compete for the final; the top ten countries from each semi-final progress to the final. The European Broadcasting Union (EBU) split up the competing countries into six different pots based on voting patterns from previous contests, with countries with favourable voting histories put into the same pot. On 25 January 2012, a special allocation draw was held which placed each country into one of the two semi-finals, as well as which half of the show they would perform in. Belgium was placed into the first semi-final, to be held on 22 May 2012, and was scheduled to perform in the first half of the show. The running order for the semi-finals was decided through another draw on 20 March 2012 and Belgium was set to perform in position 8, following the entry from Switzerland and before the entry from Finland.

The two semi-finals and the final was broadcast in Belgium by both the Flemish and Walloon broadcasters. VRT broadcast the shows on één and Radio 2 with commentary in Dutch by André Vermeulen and Peter Van de Veire. RTBF televised the shows on La Une with commentary in French by Jean-Pierre Hautier and Jean-Louis Lahaye. The Belgian spokesperson, who announced the Belgian votes during the final, was Peter Van de Veire.

Semi-final 
Iris took part in technical rehearsals on 13 and 17 May, followed by dress rehearsals on 21 and 22 May. This included the jury show on 21 May where the professional juries of each country watched and voted on the competing entries. The Belgian performance featured Iris in a short white dress and performing together with three backing vocalists. The stage colours were purple and blue, while the LED screens displayed floating pink bubbles in various sizes and the stage floor displayed a floral pattern in the shape of a heart at the end of the performance. The backing vocalists that joined Iris during the performance were: Billie Bentein, Jana De Valck and Joke Vincke.

At the end of the show, Belgium was not announced among the top 10 entries in the first semi-final and therefore failed to qualify to compete in the final. It was later revealed that Belgium placed seventeenth in the semi-final, receiving a total of 16 points.

Voting 
Voting during the three shows consisted of 50 percent public televoting and 50 percent from a jury deliberation. The jury consisted of five music industry professionals who were citizens of the country they represent. This jury was asked to judge each contestant based on: vocal capacity; the stage performance; the song's composition and originality; and the overall impression by the act. In addition, no member of a national jury could be related in any way to any of the competing acts in such a way that they cannot vote impartially and independently.

Following the release of the full split voting by the EBU after the conclusion of the competition, it was revealed that Belgium had placed eighteenth (last) with the public televote and fifteenth with the jury vote in the first semi-final. In the public vote, Belgium scored 2 points, while with the jury vote, Belgium scored 38 points.

Below is a breakdown of points awarded to Belgium and awarded by Belgium in the first semi-final and grand final of the contest. The nation awarded its 12 points to Russia in the semi-final and to Sweden in the final of the contest.

Points awarded to Belgium

Points awarded by Belgium

References

2012
Countries in the Eurovision Song Contest 2012
Eurovision